The 2021 JSM Challenger of Champaign–Urbana was a professional tennis tournament played on hard courts. It was the 25th edition of the tournament which was part of the 2021 ATP Challenger Tour. It took place in Champaign, Illinois, United States between November 15 and November 21, 2021.

Singles main-draw entrants

Seeds

 1 Rankings are as of November 8, 2021.

Other entrants
The following players received wildcards into the singles main draw:
  Ezekiel Clark
  Vasil Kirkov
  Aleksandar Kovacevic

The following players received entry from the qualifying draw:
  Gijs Brouwer
  Arjun Kadhe
  Ben Shelton
  Keegan Smith

Champions

Singles

 Stefan Kozlov def.  Aleksandar Vukic 5–7, 6–3, 6–4.

Doubles

  Nathaniel Lammons /  Jackson Withrow def.  Treat Huey /  Max Schnur 6–4, 3–6, [10–6]

References

2021 ATP Challenger Tour
2021
Champaign
2021 in sports in Illinois
November 2021 sports events in the United States